Hoover Commission in Poland may refer to:

American Relief Administration after World War I
Commission for Polish Relief after World War II